James Frye (b. in Andover, Massachusetts, in 1709; d. 8 January 1776) was a colonial soldier.  He filled several local offices and served at the capture of Louisburg in 1745.

He was the colonel in command the Essex County regiment (known as Frye's Regiment) at the beginning of the American Revolution.  He was in command of the regiment when it became part of the Army of Observation in May 1775 and was wounded the battle of Bunker Hill on 17 June of the same year.

He afterward commanded the 6th Brigade of the Continental Army during the Siege of Boston.

He was discharged, along with his regiment, on December 31, 1775.

Notes

References
 

1709 births
1776 deaths
Continental Army officers from Massachusetts